Ski-U-Mah may refer to:
 
 Ski-U-Mah (magazine)
 Ski-U-Mah (slogan)